The Brooklyn Lodge or Brooklyn Lake Lodge was built in 1922–23 for former rodeo performer Harry "Hoot" Jones. The log lodge, located near Centennial, Wyoming in the Snowy Range of Medicine Bow National Forest, was operated by the Jones family until the late 1930s.

References

External links
Brooklyn Lake Lodge at the Wyoming State Historic Preservation Office

Houses completed in 1923
Houses on the National Register of Historic Places in Wyoming
Rustic architecture in Wyoming
Houses in Albany County, Wyoming
Dude ranches in Wyoming
National Register of Historic Places in Albany County, Wyoming